Esau is a 2019 Russian-Israeli-British drama film directed by Pavel Lungin and starring Harvey Keitel and Shira Haas.  It is based on Meir Shalev's novel of the same name.

The film premiered at the 2019 Hong Kong Jewish Film Festival.

Premise
A 40-year-old writer returns to his family home where he was raised and that he escaped after half a lifetime, to face his brother who stayed instead. After inheriting their family bakery and marrying the woman they both loved.

Cast
 Shira Haas as Leah, Young Jacob's Wife
 Harvey Keitel as Abraham, Esau and Jacob's Father
Omri Raveh as Young Abraham
 Yuliya Peresild as Sarah, Esau and Jacob's Mother
 Mark Ivanir as Jacob, Esau's Brother
Lion Ravich as Young Jacob
 Kseniya Rappoport as Cheznous, Leah's Friend
 Lior Ashkenazi as Esau, Jacob's Brother
Yoav Rotman as Young Esau
 Omer Goldman as Romi, Leah and Jacob's Daughter
 Helena Yaralova as Tzviah, Leah's Mother
 Valery Smirnov as Michael, Grandfather
 Lola S. Frey as Kafrit
 Gila Almagor as Bulica
 Oren Rehany as Doctor

References

External links
 
 

2010s English-language films
English-language Russian films
2010s Russian-language films
Israeli drama films
British drama films
Russian drama films
2019 drama films
2019 films
Films based on Israeli novels
Films directed by Pavel Lungin
2019 multilingual films
British multilingual films
Israeli multilingual films
Russian multilingual films
Esau
Films based on the Hebrew Bible
2010s British films